Ganesh Trimbak Deshpande (14 August 1910 - 18 November 1989),  was an Indian writer, scholar and critic from Maharashtra. Deshpande has authored more than 12 classical works. He has attained international renown and recognition by his scholarly contribution to literary treasure. His Bharatiya Sahitya Shastra work published in 1958, brought him the highest national literary distinction of Sahitya Akademi Award in 1959.

Life
G. T. Deshpande was born in 
a Deshastha Brahmin family on 14 August 1910 in Wadnergangai,a village in Amravati district of Maharashtra. Deshpande studied law after his graduation with Sanskrit as one of the subjects for Bachelor of Arts in 1934 and Master of Arts in Sanskrit in 1940 from Nagpur University. Deshpande started his career as an advocate. Deshpande taught Sanskrit and Law in Shivaji Arts College, Amravati from (1946 - 1958). He later joined Department of Sanskrit in Nagpur University as professor and worked from (1959 - 1972) and was the Head of the Department of Humanities from (1968 - 1972).

Works
Deshpande has authored more than 12 classical works om Vedas, Alankarashastra, Grammar and Indian Philosophy.

Alankar Pradeep
Sankhya Karika

Awards and honours
1959 : Sahitya Akademi Award
 D.Litt., 1960: Nagpur University, Nagpur, India

References

Bibliography

Indian male poets
Hindu poets
Indian Sanskrit scholars
Sanskrit grammarians
Academic staff of Rashtrasant Tukadoji Maharaj Nagpur University
Indian literary critics
Marathi-language writers
Marathi-language poets
1910 births
1989 deaths
Recipients of the Sahitya Akademi Award in Marathi